Hemibagrus caveatus is a species of bagrid catfish found in Indonesia.

References

Bagridae
Fish of Asia
Fish of Indonesia
Taxa named by Heok Hee Ng
Fish described in 2001